Tate Boswell Robertson (born May 31, 1997) is an American soccer player who plays as a midfielder for Lexington SC in USL League One.

Career

College and amateur
Robertson played four years of college soccer at Bowling Green University between 2015 and 2018, scoring 8 goals and tallying 22 assists in 71 appearances.

During and after college, Robertson also appeared for USL League Two side Dayton Dutch Lions during their 2018 and 2019 seasons. During 2018, Robertson was named in the USL PDL Best XI for the 2018 season.

Professional
In September 2019, Robertson signed for NISA side Stumptown Athletic ahead of the league's inaugural season. He scored his first goal with the team on February 29, 2020 against San Diego 1904 FC.

On January 28, 2021, Robertson signed with NISA side Chattanooga FC ahead of the Spring 2021 season.

Robertson joined USL League One expansion club Lexington SC on January 12, 2023.

References

External links
 Profile at Bowling Green Athletics
 Stumptown Athletic profile

1997 births
Living people
American soccer players
Association football midfielders
Bowling Green Falcons men's soccer players
Dayton Dutch Lions players
Stumptown AC players
Chattanooga FC players
Lexington SC players
Soccer players from Ohio
USL League Two players
National Independent Soccer Association players
Sportspeople from Springfield, Ohio